Bajo Aragón-Caspe or Baix Aragó-Casp is a comarca in eastern Aragon, bordering the Spanish Autonomous Community of Catalonia.

It borders the Aragonese comarques of Matarranya, Monegros, Bajo Cinca, Bajo Martín and Ribera Baja del Ebro, and the Catalan comarques of Terra Alta, Baix Ebre, and Ribera d'Ebre.

This comarca is named after the town of Caspe, its capital. Its main income is derived from the production of olive oil.

Municipalities

The Catalan version of the names of the towns are in brackets.
Caspe (Casp)
Chiprana
Fayón (Faió)
Fabara (Favara de Matarranya) 
Maella
Nonaspe (Nonasp)

See also
La Franja
Lower Aragon

References

Comarcas of Aragon
La Franja
Geography of the Province of Zaragoza